Ukays, also known as U.K's, is a Malaysian rock band. The band was founded by Malaysian songwriter Saari Amri in 1986. The band rose to fame in 1994 with the release of their successful album Bisa Berbisa, which sold more than 400,000 units.

History
The band was formed in 1986 and they released their first album Tinggal Irama in 1991. However, the album sold poorly and Ukays lost their label, Varia Music, after it unexpectedly closed. Amri and Ridhuan Abu Bakar opened their own label, Mekar Production. The band then changed their name from Ukay to Ukays. After the switch to a new label, Amir Ukays joined and became the band's lead singer. In 1992, the band released another unsuccessful album, Mencari.

In 1994, the fortunes of Ukays improved when they released Bisa Berbisa. The album became the highest selling Malaysian album of all time until the nasheed group Raihan surpassed it with their Puji-Pujian album in 1997. Bisa Berbisa received widespread radio play, particularly the songs "Seksa", "Kau Satu-Satunya", "Siapa Yang Rampas Cintamu" and"Di Sana Menanti Di Sini Menunggu". However, after a dispute over royalties, the majority of the band left, leaving only Amir Ukays and Amy Ukays. Drummer Amirol, bassist Olley and guitarist Daniel then joined the band. Ukays released their third album  Tajam Menikam in 1995, selling 280,000 units. The album also sold well in Indonesia. After disappointing sales of their 1996 album l Cuma Aku Yang Hidup the members of Ukays left the label. Ukays then signed with Ambang Klasik and Rahmad Mega joined the group as their lead singer.

In 1997, Saari Amri published the band's fifth album Cuma Aku Yang Hidup. The album sold 100,000 units and was published by Kumbang Production. The band used BMG Music as a distributor. Cuma Aku Yang Hidup was not well received due to the economic crisis at that time and also the problem of music piracy. The most successful song from the album was "Kerana Pepatah Lukaku Berdarah".

HERE IS MORE ACCURATE 
https://ms.wikipedia.org/wiki/Kumpulan_U.K%27s
More detail and full explanation.

Legal troubles
Several members of the band have encountered legal problems. In 2015, Amir Ukays was charged with possession of an imitation pistol. Akel, who played the drums for the band's 2000 album Pijar Kasmaran, moved to Syria in 2013 after the start of the Syrian Civil War and joined Daesh. In 2019, Akel was accused of plotting to blow up locations in Johor Bahru.
In 1997, Amy, Daniel, Amirol & Olley left and, together with Rahmat Mega, formed a new band with the name Utama. This leaves only Amir as the sole member of Ukays.

Discography

Album studio

References

Malaysian rock music groups
Musical groups established in 1986